Khaled Hussein Mohamed al Tarhouni  (born  24 February 1977) is a Libyan football midfielder. As of the 2009–10 season, he plays for the Libyan Premier League club Nasr Benghazi. He is the captain of Nasr and has played in the first team for over 10 years.

Early years

Hussein was born on February 24, 1977, in Benghazi. In 1988, at the age of 10, he joined the club he grew up supporting as a boy in 1988. Since then, he has advanced through the ranks, playing the youth, reserve, and eventually first, teams.

In the 1995–96 season, Hussein helped the reserve team to the Reserve Premier League title, his first major achievement as a player.

First team
In the next season, he debuted for the first team in its match against Al Suqoor at the age of 19. Initially deployed as a playmaker, Hussein gradually grew in importance to the team. He is a goalscoring midfielder as well, having scored over 60 goals in national competitions. He scored his first goal for the club in his debut season, in a 3–0 victory against Afriqi. He helped his side to their Libyan Cup victory in 1997.

International career
After his performance in the first season, Hussein was selected for the squad that was to play at the 1998 Arab Nations Cup in Qatar. He emerged as an important player for the national team after that, and scored his first international goal against Kenya on January 19, 2004. Hussein has made 11 appearances in FIFA World Cup qualifying matches.

Hussein was an important part of the national team. Many managers, such as Mahmoud Al-Sharif, Yousef Sidqi and the Tunisian Munsaf Arfaoui, built their teams around him and Tarik El Taib, and were committed to selecting him for the squad.

Loyalty
Hussein has received many offers to join various clubs both inside and outside Libya, but has refused them to remain with his boyhood club.

Trophies Won
Al Nasr Benghazi
Libyan Cup
Winner 1997, 2003
Libyan Reserve Premier League
Winner 1996-97
Libyan Premier League
Runner-Up 2002-03

References

External links

1977 births
Living people
Libyan footballers
Libya international footballers
People from Benghazi
2006 Africa Cup of Nations players
Association football midfielders
Al-Nasr SC (Benghazi) players
Libyan Premier League players